Ryan Gobbe (born 1980), also known as Mieli or Twostone, is an Australian electronic musician. He studied Music Production at Southern Cross University and graduated in 2000.

Mieli
Mieli's music has a downtempo quality, and features traditional synthesis mixed with "clicks and cuts" -type sounds. Texturally, the music is varied, with both sparse ambient-type songs, and other more complex and gradual musical layering. Further characteristics are throbbing bass and crackle of [songs such as] "Fly-over" and shuffling gentle house tones of "Eighty-hour Sequence". Further description of the music has been made as fluttering and beautifully intricate, shimmering minimal electronics with a deep dub pulse that will delight fans of the likes of Pole, Vladislav Delay and Mille Plateaux.

Mieli's debut album Version was released in 2004 by Australian independent record label Feral Media. It generally received favourable reviews and relatively significant attention with coverage on national radio stations such as Triple J.

Twotone
The music of Twotone features regular techno conventions, such as a regular kick drum and snare beat, but these sounds are augmented by irregular rhythmic placements and supplemental click and cut sounds. Traditional synthesis methods and sounds are often employed, often repeating a simple chord pattern. Other featured sounds are vocal snippets and occasional industrial samples.

Twotone's debut album Cinecity was released in 2004 by the Australian independent record label Bug Records. It received favorable reviews, with some praise describing it as an "impeccably produced collection". Other comments made on the music have been less positive, with comments such as the "while ‘Cinecity’ does not really re-invent the minimal-techno wheel, that's less important here than the sense of warmth and widescreen atmosphere that permeates through all of the tracks".

References

External links
 Artist profile at Australian Music Online
 Record Label profile page
 Artist profile at last.fm

1980 births
Living people
Australian electronic musicians
Southern Cross University alumni